Acrocera unguiculata is a species of small-headed flies in the family Acroceridae.

Distribution
United States.

References

Acroceridae
Insects described in 1848
Diptera of North America
Taxa named by John O. Westwood